The following is a list of works by American painter Edward Hopper.

References

Edward Hopper
Hopper, Edward